The following highways are numbered 5A:

Canada
 British Columbia Highway 5A

India
  National Highway 5A (India)

Japan

United States
  U.S. Route 5A (Massachusetts) (former)
  Florida State Road 5A (Volusia County)
  Florida State Road 5A (St. Augustine)
  County Road 5A (Brevard County, Florida)
  County Road 5A (Broward County, Florida)
  County Road 5A (Indian River County, Florida)
  County Road 5A (Martin County, Florida)
  Massachusetts Route 5A (former)
  Nevada State Route 5A (former)
  County Route 5A (Monmouth County, New Jersey)
  New York State Route 5A
  County Route 5A (Allegany County, New York)
  County Route 5A (Columbia County, New York)
  County Route 5A (Nassau County, New York)
  County Route 5A (Schoharie County, New York)
  Oklahoma State Highway 5A
  Vermont Route 5A